Lee Ah-hyun (born April 13, 1972) is a South Korean actress. She made her acting debut in the television drama Daughter of a Rich Family, for which she won Best New Actress at the 1994 KBS Drama Awards.

Filmography

Television series

Film

Variety show

References

External links
 
 
 
 

1972 births
Living people
South Korean television actresses
South Korean film actresses
Actresses from Seoul
Yonsei University alumni
Sejong University alumni